The 1999 Ryedale District Council election to the Ryedale District Council were held on 6 May 1999.  The whole council was up for election and the council stayed under no overall control.

Election result

|}

External links
1999 Ryedale election result

1999
1999 English local elections
1990s in North Yorkshire